Mirror life (also called mirror-image life) is a hypothetical form of life with mirror-reflected molecular building blocks. The possibility of mirror life was first discussed by Louis Pasteur. Although this alternative life form has not been discovered in nature, efforts to build a mirror-image version of biology's molecular machinery are already underway.

Homochirality
Many of the essential molecules for life on Earth can exist in two mirror-image forms, referred to as "left-handed" and "right-handed", but living organisms do not use both. Proteins are exclusively composed of left-handed amino acids; RNA and DNA contain only right-handed sugars. This phenomenon is known as homochirality. It is not known whether homochirality emerged before or after life, whether the building blocks of life must have this particular chirality, or indeed whether life needs to be homochiral. Protein chains built from amino acids of mixed chirality tend not to fold or function as catalysts, but mirror-image proteins have been constructed that work the same but on substrates of opposite handedness.

The concept
Hypothetically, it is possible to recreate an entire ecosystem from the bottom up, in mirror form.  

Advances in synthetic biology, like synthesizing viruses since 2002, partially synthetic bacteria in 2010, or synthetic ribosomes in 2013, may lead to the possibility of fully synthesizing a living cell from small molecules, where we could use mirror-image versions (enantiomers) of life's building-block molecules, in place of the standard ones. Some proteins have been synthesized in mirror-image versions, including polymerase in 2016.

Reconstructing regular lifeforms in mirror-image form, using the mirror-image (chiral) reflection of their cellular components, could be achieved by substituting left-handed amino acids with right-handed ones, in order to create mirror reflections of all regular proteins. Analogously, we could get reflected sugars, DNA, etc., on which reflected enzymes would work perfectly. Finally we would get a normally functioning mirror reflection of a natural organism — a chiral counterpart organism. 

Electromagnetic force (chemistry) is unchanged under such molecular reflection transformation (P-symmetry). There is a small alteration of weak interactions under reflection, which can produce very small corrections, but these corrections are many orders of magnitude lower than thermal noise - almost certainly too tiny to alter any biochemistry. However, there are also theories that weak interactions can have a greater effect on longer nucleic acids or protein chains, resulting in much less efficient conversion of mirror ribozymes or enzymes than normal ribozymes or enzymes.

Mirror animals would need to feed on reflected food, produced by reflected plants.  Mirror viruses would not be able to attack natural cells, just as natural viruses would not be able to attack mirror cells.

Mirror life presents potential dangers. For example, a chiral-mirror version of cyanobacteria, which only needs achiral nutrients and light for photosynthesis, could take over Earth's ecosystem due to lack of natural enemies, disturbing the bottom of the food chain by producing mirror versions of the required sugars. Some bacteria can digest L-glucose; exceptions like this would give some rare lifeforms an unanticipated advantage.

Direct applications
Direct application of mirror-chiral organisms can be mass production of enantiomers (mirror-image) of molecules produced by normal life.

Enantiopure drugs - some pharmaceuticals have known different activity depending on enantiomeric form,
Aptamers (L-ribonucleic acid aptamers): "That makes mirror-image biochemistry a potentially lucrative business. One company that hopes so is Noxxon Pharma in Berlin. It uses laborious chemical synthesis to make mirror-image forms of short strands of DNA or RNA called aptamers, which bind to therapeutic targets such as proteins in the body to block their activity. The firm has several mirror-aptamer candidates in human trials for diseases including cancer; the idea is that their efficacy might be improved because they aren't degraded by the body's enzymes. A process to replicate mirror-image DNA could offer a much easier route to making the aptamers, says Sven Klussmann, Noxxon Pharma's chief scientific officer."
L-Glucose, enantiomer of standard glucose, for which tests showed that it tastes likes standard sugar, but not being metabolized the same way. However, it was never marketed due to excessive manufacturing costs. More recent research allows cheap production with high yields, however the authors state that it is not usable as a sweetener due to laxative effects.

In fiction

The creation of a mirror human is the basis of 1950 Arthur C. Clarke's story "Technical Error", from The Collected Stories. In this story, a physical accident transforms a person into his mirror image, speculatively explained by travel through a fourth physical dimension.

In the 1970 Star Trek novel Spock Must Die! by James Blish, the science officer of the USS Enterprise is replicated in mirror form by a transporter mishap.  He locks himself in the sick bay where he is able to synthesize mirror forms of basic nutrients needed for his survival.

An alien machine that reverses chirality, and a blood-symbiote that functions properly only when in one chirality, were central to Roger Zelazny's 1976 novel Doorways in the Sand.

On the titular planet of Sheri S. Tepper’s 1989 novel Grass, some lifeforms have evolved to use the right-handed isomer of alanine.

In the Mass Effect series, chirality of amino acids in foodstuffs is discussed often in both dialogue and encyclopedia files.

In the 2014 science fiction novel Cibola Burn by James S. A. Corey, the planet Ilus has indigenous life with partially-mirrored chirality. This renders human colonists unable to digest native flora and fauna, and greatly complicates conventional farming. Consequently, the colonists have to rely upon hydroponic farming and food importation.

In the 2017 Daniel Suarez novel Change Agent, an antagonist, Otto, nicknamed the "Mirror Man", is revealed to be a genetically-engineered mirror human. He views other humans with disdain and causes them to feel an inexplicable repulsion by his very presence.

See also
Xenobiology
Mirror matter – A hypothetical form of matter that interacts only weakly with normal matter, which could form mirror planets, potentially inhabited by mirror matter life.
Peptidomimetic#D-peptides

References

Chirality
Synthetic biology
Hypothetical life forms